Diglyceride kinase may refer to:
 Diacylglycerol kinase (CTP dependent), an enzyme
 Diacylglycerol kinase, an enzyme